Lukavec may refer to:

Lukavec, Croatia, a village in Croatia
Lukavec (Litoměřice District), a municipality and village in the Ústí nad Labem Region, Czech Republic
Lukavec (Pelhřimov District), a market town in the Vysočina Region, Czech Republic
Dolní Lukavice, Czech Republic, a municipality and village usually referred to as Lukavec in historical writing about Joseph Haydn

See also
Lukavica (disambiguation)
Lukavice (disambiguation)
Lukavec (disambiguation)
Lokavec (disambiguation)
Lokovec